Holmes–Foster–Highlands Historic District is a national historic district located at State College, Centre County, Pennsylvania.  The district includes 727 contributing buildings in two residential areas of State College: Holmes–Foster and the Highlands. The district reflects the growth and development of State College as an emerging college town.  The houses are largely wood frame and exhibit a number of popular early-20th-century architectural styles including Colonial Revival, Tudor Revival, and Bungalow. Non-residential buildings include two schools, three churches, a few shops, and the high school football stadium, Memorial Field. Located in the district is the separately listed Camelot.

It was added to the National Register of Historic Places in 1995.

References

Historic districts on the National Register of Historic Places in Pennsylvania
Colonial Revival architecture in Pennsylvania
Tudor Revival architecture in Pennsylvania
Historic districts in Centre County, Pennsylvania
National Register of Historic Places in Centre County, Pennsylvania